The 1973 Atlanta 500 was the sixth race in the NASCAR 1973 Winston Cup Series, held on April 1, 1973, at Atlanta International Raceway in Hampton, Georgia. The race took three hours and thirty-four minutes.

Attendance to this event has varying estimates. Many racing statistic archives list it at 46,000 people; the Associated Press reported a figure of 72,000 the day after the race.

Car flip world record 
At this event, daredevil Dusty Russell flipped a stock car in the air and landed 157 feet after a five foot ramp, in what was then a world record. He suffered a broken nose.

Race report
No time trials were conducted due to weather. Famous teams like Wood Brothers Racing, Nord Krauskopf's K&K Insurance Racing along with Penske Racing South would make their early impressions on the sport with their massive budgets and corporate sponsors paying for new tires and engines instead of an individual owner or driver. There were only five traditional single-car owners at this race.

Souvenir programs were sold at this event for $2 USD ($ when adjusted for inflation).

David Pearson defeated Bobby Isaac in his 1971 Mercury Cyclone by two laps; Four cautions slowed the race for 31 laps. This would be David Pearson's second win in 1973 when he won 11 races of the 18 he entered. 

Tony Bettenhausen Jr. was the last-place finisher due to an oil leak on lap 9 out of 328. After Darrell Waltrip's car was eliminated from the race (he charged to fifth place but was involved in a crash with Richard Petty and Buddy Baker), he substituted for A.J. Foyt. Pete Hamilton and Mark Donohue would retire from NASCAR after this race while Charles Barrett and Bettenhausen Jr. would make their introductions to the Cup Series during this race.

The winner received $16,625 in race winnings ($ when adjusted for inflation) while the last place finisher received $900 ($ when adjusted for inflation). The total prize purse was $103,485 ($ when adjusted for inflation).

Notable crew chiefs who participated in this race included Tim Brewer, Jake Elder, Travis Carter, Harry Hyde, Dale Inman, Tom Vandiver, and Bud Moore.

Starting grid

Failed to qualify: Eddie Bond (#0), Tony Bettenhausen Jr. (#38), John Utsman (#49)

Finishing order
Section reference: 

 David Pearson (No. 21)
 Bobby Isaac (No. 15)
 Benny Parsons (No. 72)
 Buddy Baker (No. 71)
 Cale Yarborough (No. 11)
 Coo Coo Marlin (No. 14)
 Dick Brooks (No. 90)
 Cecil Gordon (No. 24)
 Clarence Lovell (No. 61)
 Jim Vandiver (No. 31)
 Gordon Johncock (No. 28)
 Dave Marcis (No. 2)
 Richard Childress (No. 96)
 Walter Ballard (No. 30)
 Buddy Arrington (No. 67)
 Frank Warren (No. 79)
 Raymond Williams (No. 47)
 Charles Barrett (No. 09)
 Johnny Barnes (No. 89)
 Larry Smith (No.92)
 James Hylton (No. 48)
 Earle Canavan (No. 01)
 Dean Dalton* (No. 7)
 Ed Negre (No. 8)
 Charlie Roberts (No. 77)
 Elmo Langley (No. 64)
 A. J. Foyt* (No. 50)
 Joe Frasson* (No. 18)
 Bill Champion* (No. 10)
 Mark Donohue* (No. 16)
 Ron Keselowski* (No. 88)
 Roy Mayne* (No. 25)
 Darrell Waltrip* (No. 95)
 Richard Petty* (No. 43)
 Bobby Allison* (No. 12)
 John Sears* (No. 4)
 Bobby Mausgrover* (No. 07)
 Tiny Lund* (No. 55)
 Pete Hamilton* (No. 22)
 Tony Bettenhausen Jr.* (No. 84)

* Driver failed to finish race

References

Atlanta 500
Atlanta 500
NASCAR races at Atlanta Motor Speedway